The 2003 Women's Hockey Champions Challenge is the second tournament of the field hockey championship for women. It was held in Catania, on the island of Sicily in Italy from July 5–13, 2003.

Squads

Head Coach: Peter Lemmen

Head Coach: Picco Roberto

Head Coach: Tsuda Toshiro

Head Coach: Ian Rutledge

Head Coach: Jack Holtman

Head Coach: Beth Anders

Umpires
Below is the eight umpires appointed by International Hockey Federation (FIH):

Results
All times are Central European Summer Time (UTC+02:00)

Pool matches

Fixtures

Classification matches

Fifth and sixth place

Third and fourth place

Final

Awards

Statistics

Final standings

Goalscorers

References

External links
Official FIH website
Official website

Champions Challenge
Hockey Champions Challenge Women
International women's field hockey competitions hosted by Italy
Women's Hockey Champions Challenge I
Sport in Catania
Hockey Champions Challenge Women